USS Cohasset was a tugboat acquired by the Union Navy during the American Civil War. She was used by the Union Navy for various purposes: as a tugboat, dispatch vessel, escort vessel, and even as a gunboat.

Cohasset — a tug originally called E. D. Fogg and later Narragansett — was built in 1860 at Providence, Rhode Island; purchased by the Navy on 13 September 1861; outfitted at New York Navy Yard; delivered at Hampton Roads, Virginia on 26 October 1861; and assigned to duty with the Atlantic Blockading Squadron.

Assigned to the Atlantic Blockade

Providing harbor defense
Ordered to Beaufort, North Carolina in July 1864, Cohasset was used for harbor defense and towing until 1 October 1864, when she returned to Norfolk for duty towing coal barges in the James River.

Post-Civil War activity
Cohasset arrived at Boston Navy Yard on 1 June 1865. She served as yard tug there until 1882, when she was transferred to Newport, Rhode Island.

Cohasset was sold on 9 May 1892 at Newport, Rhode Island.

References

Ships of the Union Navy
Ships built in Providence, Rhode Island
Steamships of the United States Navy
Gunboats of the United States Navy
Tugs of the United States Navy
Dispatch boats of the United States Navy
American Civil War patrol vessels of the United States
1860 ships